Spasskoye-Gorodishche is a rural locality (a selo) in Pavlovskoye Rural Settlement, Suzdalsky District, Vladimir Oblast, Russia. The population was 393 as of 2010. There are 6 streets.

Geography 
Spasskoye-Gorodishche is located on the right bank of the Nerl River, 12 km southeast of Suzdal (the district's administrative centre) by road. Barskoye-Gorodishche is the nearest rural locality.

References 

Rural localities in Suzdalsky District
Suzdalsky Uyezd